This is a list of Hungarian language exonyms for cities, towns and villages located in Croatia.

Bjelovar-Bilogora County 
 Béla
Boriš Boriszállás
Bjelovar Belovár
Čazma Csázma
Daruvar Daruvár
Dežanovac Szentlélek
Dioš Diósszentpál
Dobra Kuća Dobrakutya
Đulovac Gyulovac
Garešnica Gerzence
Grbavac Gerbavác
Grubišno Polje Grobosinc
Hercegovac Szentkirály
Kapela Kápolna
Mala Barna Kisbarna
Mala Pisanica Kispisznice
Međurača Megyericse
Rovišće Rojcsa
Sirač Szircs
Štefanje Szentistván
Velika Barna Nagybarna
Veliki Grđevac Nagygordonya
Zrinski Topolovac Tapalóc

Brod-Posavina County 
Bebrina Bebrene
Brodski Stupnik Sztupnik
Bukovlje Bukolya
Cernik Csernek
Davor Dávor
Donji Andrijevci Alsóandrievce
Dragalić Dragalics
Garčin Garcsin
Gornja Vrba Felsőverbafalva
Gornji Bogićevci Felsőbogics
Gundinci Gundince
Nova Gradiška Újgradiska
Nova Kapela Újkapela
Okučani Okucsány
Oprisavci Opriszavce
Oriovac Orjovác
Podcrkavlje Podcerkve
Podvrško Podversa
Rešetari Resetár
Sibinj Szibény
Sikirevci Szikérevce
Slavonski Brod Bród or Nagyrév
Stara Gradiška Ógradiska
Staro Petrovo Selo Ópetroszelló
Velika Kopanica Nagykopanica
Vrbje Verbie

Dubrovnik-Neretva County
Dubrovnik Raguza
Korčula Korcsula
Metković Metkovics
Mljet Mlyet
Lastovo Lasztovo
Ploče Plocse

Lika-Senj County 
Brinje Brinye
Donji Lapac Alsólapac
Gornji Lapac Felsőlapac
Gospić Goszpics
Jablanac Tengervárad
Karlobag Karlopagó
Otočac Otocsán
Perušić Perusics
Plitvička Jezera Plitvice
Senj Zengg
Udbina Korbávia

Osijek-Baranja County 
Aljmaš Almás
Baranjsko Petrovo Selo Petárda
Batina Kiskőszeg
Beli Manastir Pélmonostor
Belišće Belistye
Bijelo Brdo Darnó
Bilje Bellye
Bolman Bolmány
Branjina Baranyakisfalud
Branjin Vrh Baranyavár
Čeminac Laskafalu
Čepin Csapa or Csepén
Ceremošnjak Ceremosvölgye
Čepinski Martinci Bucsinfalva
Čokadinci Csokad
Cret Bizovački Verőfény
Đakovo Diakóvár
Dalj Dál
Darda Dárda
Donja Motičina Alsómoticsina
Donji Miholjac Szentmihály
Dopsin Dobsza
Draž Darázs
Duboševica Dályok
Đurđanci Szentgyörgy
Erdut Erdőd
Ernestinovo Ernőháza
Feričanci Ferencfalva
Gajić Hercegmárok
Gorjani Gara
Grabovac Albertfalu
Gradac Našički Váralja
Harkanovci Harkányfalva
Hrastin Haraszti
Ivanovac Derzs
Jagodnjak Kácsfalu
Jasenovac Öbölpuszta
Kamenac Kő
Karanac Karancs
Kešinci Kese
Klisa Tard
Kneževi Vinogradi Hercegszőlős
Kneževo Főherceglak
Kopačevo Kopács
Koprivna Kaporna
Koritna Karatna
Koška Kosvár
Kotlina Sepse
Kozarac Keskend
Kozjak Keskenyerdő
Kuševac Vatinc
Ladimirevci Ladomérfalva
Laslovo Szentlászló
Levanjska Varoš Névna
Lovas Daljski Lovász
Luč Lőcs
Lug Laskó
Majške Međe Majspuszta
Marjančaci Marjánc
Martin Nekcseszentmárton
Mece Mecepuszta
Mirkovac Frigyesföld
Mitrovac Mitvárpuszta
Nemetin Németi
Nard Nart
Našice Nekcse
Novi Bezdan Újbezdán
Novi Bolman Újbolmány
Novi Čeminac Újlaskafalu
Novo Nevesinje Botond
Osijek Eszék
Petlovac Baranyaszentistván
Petrijevci Petróc
Podolje Nagybodolya
Podravlje Jenőfalva
Podravska Moslavina Monoszló
Podunavlje Dunaipuszta
Popovac Baranyabán
Punitovci Panyit
Retfala Rétfalu
Samatovci Szombattelek
Sarvaš Szarvas
Semeljci Hosszúfalu
Selci Đakovački Szelce
Silaš Szilas
Sokolovac Katalinpuszta
Sudaraž Szudarázs
Sveti Đurađ Szentgyörgy
Suza Csúza
Šag Ság
Širine Braidaföld
Šodolovci Páznán
Šumarina Benge
Švajcarnica Őrhely
Tenja Tenye
Tikveš Tököspuszta
Topolje Izsép
Torjanci Torjánc
Tvrđavica Kisdárda
Uglješ Ölyves
Valpovo Valpó
Vardarac Várdaróc
Viljevo Villyó
Vladislavci Lacháza
Vuka Kisújlak
Zelčin Zselcsinic
Zeleno Polje Szentistvánpuszta
Zlatna Greda Bokroshátpuszta
Zmajevac Vörösmart

Primorje-Gorski Kotar County 
Crikvenica Cirkvenica
Čabar Csabar
Opatija Abbázia
Rijeka Fiume
Vrbovsko Vrbovszkó

Istria County
Pula Póla

Koprivnica-Križevci County 
Drnje Dörnye
Đelekovec Gyekelóc
Đurđevac Szentgyörgyvár
Ferdinandovac Décseszentpál
Gola Góla
Gotalovo Gotála
Kalinovac Kalinóc
Kalnik Nagykemlék
Kloštar Podravski Gorbonok
Koprivnica Kapronca
Križevci Kőrös
Legrad Légrád
Molve Molna
Novigrad Podravski Kamarcsa or Szentklára
Peteranec Szentpéter
Podravske Sesvete Mindszent
Rasinja Apajkeresztúr
Repaš Répás
Virje Prodavíz
Ždala Zsdála

Karlovac County 
Karlovac Károlyváros
Modruš Modrus
Ozalj Ozaly
Slunj Szluin
Vojnić Vojnics

Krapina-Zagorje County 
Klanjec Klanyec
Krapina Korpona
Marija Bistrica Máriabeszterce

Međimurje County 
Badličan Zalabárdos
Banfi Bánfihegy
Benkovec Zalabenkő
Bogdanovec Károlyszeg
Brezje Nyíresfalva
Bukovec Bükkösd
Brezovec Muranyirád
Čakovec Csáktornya
Čehovec Csehlaka
Čestijanec Hétház
Cirkovljan Drávaegyház
Črečan Cseresznyés
Čukovec Drávasiklós
Dekanovec Dékánfalva
Domašinec Damása
Donja Dubrava Alsódomború
Donji Hrašćan Harastyán
Donji Koncovčak Alsóvéghegy
Donji Kraljevec Murakirály
Donji Mihaljevec Alsómihályfalva
Donji Pustakovec Alsópusztafa
Donji Vidovec Muravid
Donji Zebanec Alsóhideghegy
Dragoslavec Kedveshegy
Dragoslavec Breg Újhegy
Dragoslavec Selo Delejes
Draškovec Ligetvár
Držimurec Dezsérlaka
Dunjkovec Dúshely
Ferketinec Alsóferencfalva
Frkanovec Ferenchegy
Gardinovec Muragárdony
Goričan Muracsány
Gornja Dubrava Felsődomború
Gornji Hrašćan Drávacsány
Gornji Koncovčak Felsővéghegy
Gornji Kraljevec Felsőkirályfalva
Gornji Kuršanec Felsőzrínyifalva
Gornji Mihajlevec Felsőmihályfalva
Gornji Pustakovec Felsőpusztafa
Gornji Vidovec Felsővidafalva
Grabrovnik Gáborvölgy
Gradiščak Várhegy
Grkaveščak Göröghegy
Hemuševec Henisfalva
Hlapičina Lapány
Hodošan Hodosány
Ivanovec Drávaszentiván
Jalšovec Erzsébetlak
Jurčevec Györgylaka
Jurovčak Györgyhegy
Jurovec Györgyike
Kapelščak Margithegy
Knezovec Gyümölcsfalva
Kotoriba Kotor
Krištanovec Kristóffalva
Križovec Muraszentkereszt
Kuršanec Zrínyifalva
Lapšina Tündérlak
Macinec Miksavár
Mačkovec Nyírvölgy
Mala Subotica Kisszabadka
Mali Mihaljevec Kismihályfalva
Marof Majorlak
Martinuševec Mártonhalom
Merhatovec Morzsahegy
Mihovljan Drávaszentmihály
Miklavec Mikófa
Mursko Središće Muraszerdahely
Leskovec Kismagyaród
Lopatinec Lapáthegy
Nedelišće Drávavásárhely
Novakovec Muraújfalu
Novo Selo na Dravi Drávaújfalu
Novo Selo Rok Jánosfalva or Rókusújfalu
Okrugli Vrh Kerekhegy
Oporovec Drávafüred
Orehovica Drávadiós
Otok Ottok
Palinovec Alsópálfa
Palovec Felsőpálfa
Peklenica Bányavár
Plešivica Kopaszhegy
Pleškovec Bányahegy
Podbrest Drávaszilas
Podturen Bottornya
Praporčan Paphegy
Prelog Perlak
Preseka Hétvezér
Pretetinec Drávaóhíd
Prhovec Királylak
Pribislavec Zalaújvár
Pušćine Pusztafa
Robađe Robádihegy
Savska Ves Százkő
Selnica Szelencehegy
Šenkovec Szentilona
Sivica Muraszilvágy
Slakovec Édeskút
Stanetinec Határőrs
Štefanec Drávaszentistván
Strahoninec Drávanagyfalu
Strelec Muralövő
Štrigova Stridóvár
Štrukovec Muraréthát
Sveta Maria Muraszentmária
Sveti Juraj u Trnju Tüskeszentgyörgy
Sveti Križ Muraszentkereszt
Sveti Martin na Muri Muraszentmárton
Sveti Urban Szentorbánhegy
Totovec Tótfalu
Trnovec Drávamagyaród
Turčišće Törökudvar
Tupkovec Turzóvölgy
Vučetinec Oskolahegy
Vugrišinec Vargahegy
Vukanovec Farkashegy
Vularija Drávaollár
Vratišinec Murasiklós
Vrhovljan Ormos
Zasadberg Gyümölcshegy
Zaveščak Faluhegy
Zebanec Selo Hidegfalu
Žabnik Békásd
Železna Gora Vashegy
Žiškovec Zsidény

Požega-Slavonia County 
Brekinska Brekinszka
Brestovac Bresztovác
Brodski Drenovac Kisdarnóc
Čaglin Cseglény
Dobrogošće Dobrogostya
Duboka Doboka
Gradište Gradistye
Imrijevci Imrepaka
Jakšić Jakusfölde
Jurkovac Györkvölgy
Kaptol Pozsegaszentpéter
Kula Gotószentgyörgy
Kutjevo Gotó
Mali Bilač Kisbilács
Migalovci Migalóc
Nova Ljeskovica Újleszkovica
Oljasi Velikeolaszi
Orljavac Orjava
Pakrac Pakrác
Požeška Koprivnica Kapronca
Pleternica Pleterniceszentmiklós
Požega Pozsega
Ratkovica Gradpatak
Ruševo Hrusszóvölgy
Sapna Szapnó
Sesvete Pozsegamindszent
Stara Ljeskovica Óleszkovica
Svilna Szvinna
Tekić Tekics
Trenkovo Trenkfalva
Velika Velike
Veliki Bilač Nagybilács

Sisak-Moslavina County 
Batinova Kosa Batinovakosza
Crni Potok Cernipotok
Donja Čemernica Alsócsemernice
 Gregyán
Hrvatska Kostajnica Horvátkosztajnica
Hrvatsko Selo Horvátfalu
Katinovac Katinovác
Kutina Kutenya
Mala Vranovina Kisvránovina
Malička Malicska
Novska Novszka
Pecka Pecke
Petrinja Petrinya
Ponikvari Ponikvár
Sisak Sziszek
Staro Selo Topusko Topuszkaófalu
Topusko Topuszka
Velika Vranovina Nagyvránovina
Vorkapić Vorkapics

Split-Dalmatia County 
Brač Brács
Makarska Makarszka
Omiš Omis
Solin Szolin
Split Szplit
Tučepi Tucsepi

Varaždin County 
Bednja Bednya
Biškupec Varasdpüspöki
Breznica Prisznica
Donja Voća Alsóvocsa
Ivanec Ivánc
Jalžabet Szenterzsébet
Ludbreg Ludberg
Madžarevo Magyarlak
Maruševec Máriasócszentgyörgy
Novi Marof Újmarof
Petrijanec Szentpéter
Sračinec Szracsinc
Varaždin Varasd
Varaždinske Toplice Varasdfürdő
Veliki Bukovec Bukócszentpéter
Vidovec Zamlacsszentvid
Visoko Viszoka

Virovitica-Podravina County 
Bačevac Berzőceszentgyörgy
Brezovica Berzőce
Budakovac Budakóc
Čačinci Csacsince
Čađavica Szagyolca
Čemernica Csemernica
 Alsóbakóca
Donja Pištana Alsópistana
Donje Bazije Bozjás
Gaćište Gvestye
Gornja Pištana Felsőpistana
Gornje Bazje Boz
Gornji Miholjac Felsőmiholjác
Jasenaš Jaszen
Jugovo Polje Szenterzsébet
Hum Varoš Humváros
Lozan Szentbenedek
Lukač Lukács
Mikleuš Szentmiklós
Nova Bukovica Újbakóca
 Novák
Novi Gradac Újgrác
Orahovica Raholca
Orešac Oresanc
Pitomača Pitomacsa
Rezovac Rezovác
Rogovac Szentbertalan
Sopje Szópia
Slatina Szalatnok
Slatinski Drenovac Darnóc
Starin Sztára
Suha Mlaka Szuhamlaka
Suhopolje Szentendre
Sveti Đurđ Szentgyörgy
Špišić Bukovica Bakva
Turnašica Doroszlóbakva
Vaška Vaska
Virovitica Verőce
 Visnyica
Vladimirovac Aladár
Voćin Atyina or Vocsin
Zdenci Izdenc
Zrinj Lukački Zrinjpuszta

Vukovar-Syrmia County
Andrijaševci Andrásfalva
Babina Greda Babagerenda
Banovci Radasfalva
Bapska Babafalva
Berak Berki
Bogdanovci Bogdánfalva
Borovo Boró
Bošnjaci Bosnyáki
Cerić Cserity
Čakovci Csák
Donje Novo Selo Petyke
Drenovci Drenóc
Đeletovci Gyelétfalva
Gradište Gradiste
Gunja Gúnya
Grabovo Garáb
Ilača Illyefő
Ilok Újlak
Ivankovo Ivánkaszentgyörgy
Jarmina Jaromnaszentmiklós
Korog Kórógy
Lovas Hosszúlovász
Nuštar Berzétemonostor
Opatovac Apáti
Ostrovo Gegetinc
Komletinci Komjáti
Markušica Markusháza
Mikluševci Szentmiklós
Mirkovci Szegfalu
Mlaka Antinska Tótfalu
Mohovo Moha
Negoslavci Negoszlovce
Nijemci Csótnémeti
Novi Čakovci Újcsák
Novi Mikanovci Horváti
Nuštar Berzétemonostor
Otok Atak
Pačetin Pacsinta
Petrovci Petróc
Privlaka Perlaka
Podgrađe Váralja
Rokovci Harapk
Sotin Szata
Stari Jankovci Ivanóc
Stari Mikanovci Horváti
Šarengrad Atya
Tompojevci Tompojevce
Tordinci Valkótard
Tovarnik Felsőtárnok
Trpinja Terpenye
Vinkovci Szentillye
Vinkovački Banovci Bánóc
Vrbanja Vérbánya
Vođinci Vogyince
Vukovar Vukovár, but in the Middle Ages Valkóvár
Županja Zsupanya

Zadar County 
Gračac Gracsác
Zadar Zára

Zagreb County 
Dugo Selo Dugoszelo
Ivanić-Grad Ivanicsvár
Jastrebarsko Jasztrebarszka
Novi Farkašić Újfarkasfalva
Pisarovina Piszárovina
Pokupsko Kulpatő
Samobor Szamobor
Stari Farkašić Ófarkasfalva
Sveta Nedelja Szentnedele
Sveti Ivan Zelina Szentivánzelina
Turopolje Túrmező
Velika Gorica Nagygorica
Vrbovec Verbovec
Žumberak Zsumberk

Zagreb capital 
Zagreb Zágráb

Sources 
The MTA's (Hungarian Scientific Academy) webpage

Croatia
Hungarian language
Hungarian Exonyms
Hungarian exonyms in Croatia
Hungarian